Dicrocaulon is a genus of flowering plants belonging to the family Aizoaceae.

Its native range is South African Republic.

Species:

Dicrocaulon brevifolium 
Dicrocaulon grandiflorum 
Dicrocaulon humile 
Dicrocaulon microstigma 
Dicrocaulon nodosum 
Dicrocaulon ramulosum 
Dicrocaulon spissum

References

Aizoaceae
Aizoaceae genera
Taxa named by N. E. Brown